Matías Jimeno or Ximeno was a painter of Castile. He was a pupil of Vincenzo Carducho, and flourished about the middle of the 17th century. He painted four lateral altars for the Jeronymites of Signenza, representing The Incarnation, The Nativity, The Epiphany, and The Presentation in the Temple. His Conversion of St. Paul, dated 1652, is, perhaps, his best work.

References

17th-century Spanish painters
Spanish male painters